The Roman Catholic Diocese of Banja Luka (Serbo-Croatian: Banjalučka biskupija, Latin: Dioecesis Bania Lucensisis) is a diocese of the Latin Church of the Roman Catholic Church in western Bosnia. The diocese is centred in the city of Banja Luka, Bosnia and Herzegovina.

Erected on July 5, 1881, the diocese is a suffragan of the Archdiocese of Vrhbosna, as the Diocese of Banjaluka. In 1985, the name of the diocese was split to the current diocese of Banja Luka. Bishop Franjo Komarica is head of the diocese.

The original Cathedral of Saint Bonaventure in the city was built in 1887. However, an earthquake in 1969 levelled the church. Banja Luka's current cathedral was built in 1974.

The city of Banja Luka, and much of the territory that the diocese covers contains an Orthodox Christian majority. The Bosnian War greatly affected the diocese. Virtually all of the churches in the bishopric sustained some damage, and many were destroyed. Many Catholics were expelled from the region or fled, leaving only a fraction remaining. Bishop Komarica has been urging people to return, to mixed results.

History 

Christianity arrived on the territory of present-day diocese of Banja Luka during the Roman rule in the first century AD. Christians and bishops from the area settled around two metropolitan seats, Salona and Sirmium. In this area there was at that time the seat of at least one diocese, Diocese of Baloie (probably near Šipovo), whose bishop participated in the church synod of Salona in 530.

After the barbaric invasion and after the settlement of Slavic tribes, these regions belonged to the surrounding dioceses: Split, Nin, Knin, Krbava and Bosnia, and the area of today's Banja Luka and the entire northern region was part of the Diocese of Zagreb. A rich life of the Catholic Church in this region before falling under Ottoman rule is testified by numerous churches from ancient and medieval times discovered on the territory of the Diocese. The highest concentration was in the Bihać Deanery area.

The Ottoman conquest that brought the demolition of Catholic churches and the islamization of the population, almost completely destroyed the presence of the Catholic Church in these areas, with the exception of southern regions around Livno. City of Bihać resisted the longest, until 1591. From the time of the Ottoman conquest, the pastoral clergy in these parts were almost exclusively Bosnian Franciscans. On the Livno area was recorded the presence of Glagolitic Catholic secular priests who celebrated the Slavic liturgy. The bishops did not dare to come to parts of their dioceses that fell under Turkish rule. That is why, in 1735, instead of the existing dioceses, the Holy See founded the Apostolic Vicariate in Ottoman Bosnia (Vicariatus Apostolicus Bosniae Othomanae). The Catholic church in Banja Luka was particularly hard hit during the War of the Holy League (1683–1699). In 1737 parish church in Banja Luka was burned and numerous believers migrated to the Habsburg possessions.

After Bosnia Vilayet came under the Austro-Hungarian rule in 1878, Pope Leo XIII restored the vilayet's church hierarchy. In Ex hac augusta, his 5 July 1881 apostolic letter, Leo established a four-diocese ecclesiastical province in Bosnia and Herzegovina and abolished the previous apostolic vicariates. Sarajevo, formerly Vrhbosna, became the archdiocesan and metropolitan seat. Its suffragan dioceses became the new dioceses of Banja Luka and Mostar and the existing Diocese of Trebinje-Mrkan.

After the renewal of the regular hierarchy, the Diocese was governed by the apostolic nuncio in Vienna, and from 1883 to 1884, by the Archbishop of Vrhbosna, Josip Stadler, who served as an apostolic administrator of the Diocese.

At the time of its founding, the Diocese had some 36,000 believers. This number has accelerated rapidly with the arrival of the Austrian authorities. During the next decades, numerous Poles, Italians, Germans, Czechs and others moved in the area of the Diocese.

During the Second World War and after the war, the Diocese was catastrophically harmed. One third of all the parishes (13) have completely perished, in 10 of parishes a number of parishioners dropped significantly, and all the others were seriously injured. With a large number of killed believers, the diocese suffered severe loss of priests. During the war and after the war, at least 30 priests were killed. The Holy See started the process of beatification of 4 of them on 21 December 2014: Juraj Gospodnetić, Waldemar Maximilian Nestor, Antun Dujlović and Krešimir Barišić.

Ordinaries

Apostolic Administrators

Bishops

Auxiliary Bishops

Demographics 
Diocese of Banja Luka has a population of 550,300. As of 2012, 35,428 (6.44% of the population) are Roman Catholics.

Historical Roman Catholic population 
The historical Roman Catholic population is given in the following chart:

Deaneries

Churches

Parish churches 
This is a list of Parish churches by deanery:

Deanery of Banja Luka 
Church of the Visitation of the Blessed Virgin Mary, Banja Luka
St. Vitus's Church, Barlovci
Church of the Assumption of the Blessed Virgin Mary, Ivanjska
Church of the Assumption of the Blessed Virgin Mary, Banja Luka
Saints Peter and Paul Church, Motike
Church of Saint Anthony of Padua, Banja Luka
Church of Saint Therese of the Child Jesus, Presnače
Saints Peter and Paul Church, Šimići
Saint Joseph's Church, Trn

Deanery of Bihać 
Church of Saint Anthony of Padua, Bihać
Church of the Exaltation of the Holy Cross, Bosanska Dubica
Saint Joseph's Church, Bosanska Gradiška
Holy Trinity Church, Novi Grad
Saint Joseph's Church, Drvar
Church of Saint Leopold Mandić, Ljubija
Saint Joseph's Church, Prijedor
Saint John the Baptist Church, Ravska
Church of the Assumption of the Blessed Virgin Mary, Sanski Most
Church of the Nativity of the Blessed Virgin Mary, Sasina
Church of Saint Anthony the Hermit, Majdan
Church of Saint Anthony of Padua, Stratinska
Sacred Heart Church, Šurkovac

Deanery of Bosanska Gradiška 
Church of Saint Roch, Gradiška
Saint John the Baptist Church, Bosanski Aleksandrovac
Church of the Assumption of the Blessed Virgin Mary, Dolina
St. Francis' Church, Mahovljani
Saint Joseph's Church, Nova Topola

Deanery of Jajce 
Church of the Assumption, Jajce
Saints Philip and James Church, Mrkonjić Grad
Church of the Nativity of the Blessed Virgin Mary, Ključ
Church of Saint Elias, Liskovica

Deanery of Livno 
Church of Saint Elias, Glamoč
All Saints Church, Livno
Immaculate Conception Church (Vidoši)
Saints Peter and Paul Church, Livno
Saint John the Baptist Church, Livno
St. Michael's Church, Livno
St. Francis' Church, Bila
Church of Saint Elias, Bosansko Grahovo
Church of Saint Anthony of Padua, Čuklić
Saint Joseph's Church, Lištani
Church of the Nativity of the Blessed Virgin Mary, Ljubunčić

Deanery of Prnjavor 
Church of Saint Anthony of Padua, Prnjavor
Church of Saint Leopold Mandić, Dragalovci
Church of the Nativity of the Blessed Virgin Mary, Kotor Varoš
Church of the Nativity of the Blessed Virgin Mary, Kulaši
Church of the Assumption of the Blessed Virgin Mary, Sokoline
St. Francis' Church, Vrbanjci

Religious orders 

The Diocese of Banja Luka is home to a small number of religious orders and congregations. While there are not as many today in 2013 as there were in 1950, they still make up a large population of the diocese.

In 1950, there were 71 religious priests, 4 male religious, 310 nuns and sisters ministering in the Diocese.

As of 2013, 47 priests of religious orders, 92 religious sisters and nuns minister in the diocese.

Male Religious Orders Currently in the Diocese 
Franciscan Friars of Bosna Srebrena
Order of Cistercians of the Strict Observance (Trappists)
Carmelites

Female Religious Orders Currently in the Diocese 
Daughters of Charity of Saint Vincent de Paul
Servants of the Infant Jesus (Province of Split), established by Josip Stadler, archbishop of Vrhbosna
School Sisters of St. Francis (Bosnian-Croatian Province of Immaculate Heart of Mary)
Adorers of the Blood of Christ
Missionaries of Charity

Saints, Blesseds & Venerables of Banja Luka 
 Blessed Ivan Merz – Bosnian-Croatian lay academic, beatified by Pope John Paul II on a visit at Banja Luka, Bosnia and Herzegovina on June 23, 2003. Ivan Merz promoted the liturgical movement in Croatia and together with Ivo Protulipac created a movement for the young people, "The Croatian union of the Eagles" ("Hrvatski orlovski savez"), inspired by the "Eucharistic Crusade," which he had encountered in France.

References 

 
Banja Luka
Banja Luka
Banja Luka
1881 establishments in Austria-Hungary